Angels in Disguise is a 1949 comedy film directed by Jean Yarbrough and starring The Bowery Boys. The film was released on September 11, 1949, by Monogram Pictures and is the fifteenth film in the series.

Plot
Sach Jones and Slip Mahoney are copy boys for the New York Daily Chronicle newspaper who hear that two local police officers, including their friend Gabe, have been shot in the line of duty while trying to stop a robbery. Gabe survives, but his partner does not, so they decide to help find the person responsible--a gangster and member of the Loop Gang from Chicago. The boys then decide to go undercover to try to infiltrate the mob and expose them. They get a green light from their editor, Joe Cobb, to go and investigate the story further. They encounter two members of the Loop Gang and befriend them, with the result that they get to meet their boss, Angles Carson. Angles likes the boys and soon they are involved with the gang's next hit - a new robbery.

Before long, they get to meet Angles' boss, Carver, who takes a liking to them because he thinks they are tough gangsters that he can use in his operation. He lets the boys in on a plan to rob the Gotham Steel Works the next day, and Slip sends this information to the police. An ambush is set, to stop the robbery and catch the gangsters, but someone on the inside slips the information about the ambush to Carver. Carver changes his plans and instead tries to rob the Beacon Machine Works. Slip has no possibility to warn the police, but when Carver is trying to crack open the safe at Beacon Machine Works the next evening, Slip gets a chance to call his editor, who passes the information forward. Unfortunately, another employee at the Chronicle, a cartoonist named Lowell, informs Carver that the police are coming. There is a showdown between Slip and Sach and the Loop Gang members, and Slip and Sach are beat up badly. They are taken to the hospital, and once there, Sach calls for a nurse to take care of him, but when a male nurse arrives he sends him to over to Slip and gets up to leave.  Just as he is about to walk out the door a female nurse comes in and takes over massaging Slip's back!

Cast

The Bowery Boys
 Leo Gorcey as Terrance Aloysius 'Slip' Mahoney
 Huntz Hall as Horace Debussy 'Sach' Jones
 William Benedict as Whitey
 David Gorcey as Chuck
 Bennie Bartlett as Butch

Remaining cast
 Gabriel Dell as Gabe Moreno
 Bernard Gorcey as Louie Dumbrowski
 Mickey Knox as Angles
 Edward Ryan as Carver
 Richard Benedict as Miami
 Joseph Turkel as Johnny Mutton
 Jane Adams as First Pretty Nurse
 Marie Blake as Mildred 'Millie', Telephone Operator
 Dorothy Abbott as Reception Nurse
 Jack Gargan as Rewrite Man
 Don C. Harvey as Ralph Hodges (as Don Harvey)
 Jack Mower as Policeman at Hospital
 Pepe Hern as Bertie Spangler
 Lee Phelps as Watchman

Home media
Warner Archives released the film on made-to-order DVD in the United States as part of "The Bowery Boys, Volume Three" on October 1, 2013.

References

External links
 
 
 

1949 films
Bowery Boys films
1949 comedy films
Monogram Pictures films
American comedy films
American black-and-white films
1940s English-language films
Films directed by Jean Yarbrough
1940s American films